Yang Zhi may refer to:

 Yang Zhi (Sizu) (羊陟), style name Sizu (嗣祖), Eastern Han Dynasty official, see Book of the Later Han
 Empress Yang Zhi (楊芷; 259–292), Jin Dynasty (266–420) empress
 Jiang Nan (novelist) (born 1977), birth name Yang Zhi
 Yang Zhi (footballer) (杨智; born 1983), footballer
 Yang Zhi (Water Margin) (楊志), fictional character in the novel Water Margin